Live at the Lighthouse  may refer to a number of albums recorded at the Lighthouse Café in  Hermosa Beach, California:
The Cannonball Adderley Quintet at the Lighthouse
Live at the Lighthouse (Charles Earland album)
Live at the Lighthouse (Grant Green album)
Live at the Lighthouse (Elvin Jones album)
Live at the Lighthouse (Modern Jazz Quartet album)
Live at the Lighthouse (Lee Morgan album)
Live at the Lighthouse (The Three Sounds album)